Robert J. Devlin Jr. is a former Judge of the Connecticut Appellate Court and former Judge of the Connecticut Superior Court. He was nominated to the Appellate court by Governor Ned Lamont and began his term on May 15, 2019. Devlin retired in April 2020, after reaching the mandatory retirement age of 70.

Education 

Devlin earned a  Bachelor of Arts from Southern Connecticut State University and is an honors graduate of the University of Connecticut School of Law.

Early career 

Devlin began his career by working as a public defender and in private practice, then working for nine years as a prosecutor. From 1988–1992 he was an Assistant United States Attorney.

Superior Court service 

He was nominated to the Superior Court in December 1992 by Lowell Weicker. As a superior court judge, Devlin presided over several notable criminal cases, including State v. Beth Carpenter, State v. Russell Peeler, and State v. Christopher DiMeo.

Appellate Court service 

On April 25, 2019, Governor Ned Lamont nominated Devlin to the seat vacated by Michael Sheldon who had reached the mandatory retirement age.

Deputy Chief State's Attorney, Inspector General 
In 2021 Devlin was appointed Deputy Chief State's Attorney, Inspector General, responsible for leading Connecticut's Office of Inspector General.

References

External links
Official Biography on State of Connecticut Judicial Branch website

Living people
20th-century American judges
20th-century American lawyers
21st-century American judges
American prosecutors
Assistant United States Attorneys
Connecticut lawyers
Connecticut state court judges
Judges of the Connecticut Appellate Court
Public defenders
Superior court judges in the United States
Southern Connecticut State University alumni
University of Connecticut School of Law alumni
1950 births